Otpor (stylized as Otpor!) was a political organization in Serbia (then part of FR Yugoslavia) from 1998 until 2004.

In its initial period from 1998 to 2000, Otpor began as a civic protest group, eventually turning into a movement, which adopted the Narodni pokret (the People's Movement) title, against the policies of the Serbian authorities under the influence of Yugoslav president Slobodan Milošević. Following Milošević's overthrow in October 2000, Otpor became a political watchdog organization monitoring the activities of the post-Milošević period of the DOS coalition. Finally, during fall 2003, Otpor briefly became a political party which, due to its failure to pass the 5% threshold needed to get any seats in the Serbian parliament, soon merged with another party.

Founded and best known as an organization employing nonviolent struggle as a course of action against the Milošević-controlled Serbian authorities, Otpor grew into a civic youth movement whose activity culminated on 5 October 2000 with Milošević's overthrow. In the course of a two-year nonviolent struggle against Milošević, Otpor spread across Serbia, attracting in its heyday more than 70,000 supporters who were credited for their role in the 5 October overthrow.

After the overthrow, Otpor launched campaigns to hold the new government accountable, pressing for democratic reforms and fighting corruption, as well as insisting on cooperation with the International Criminal Tribunal (ICTY) at the Hague.

Soon after the 2003 elections, Otpor merged into the Democratic Party (DS).

Initial activity

Otpor was formed in Belgrade on 10 October 1998 in response to a controversial piece of legislation in Serbia – the university law – introduced earlier that year by the Serbian government under Prime Minister Mirko Marjanović. Also, days before Otpor got announced, the government introduced a decree (uredba) outlining special measures in the wake of the ongoing NATO bombing threat. Citing the decree, on 14 October 1998, the government's Ministry of Information headed by Aleksandar Vučić banned the publishing of Dnevni telegraf, Danas, and Naša borba, three Belgrade dailies which were critical of the government to varying degrees.

The newly formed group named Otpor mostly consisted of the Demokratska omladina (Democratic Party's youth wing) members, activists of the various NGOs that operated in Serbia, and students from the two public universities in Belgrade – University of Belgrade and University of Arts. It quickly grew from a small group into a network of similarly politically minded young people, many of whom were already veterans of anti-Milošević demonstrations such as the 1996-97 protests and the 9 March 1991 protest. With the political opposition in Serbia in disarray, Otpor decided to build a broad political movement rather than a traditional NGO or political party. Frustrated with opposition leaders protecting their narrow personal and party interests, which often degenerated into infighting, the group also decided that "it would have no leaders".

Early on, Otpor defined its objectives and methods, including an account of what it saw as the main problems of the country, in the "Declaration of the Future of Serbia." The declaration was signed and supported by all prominent student organizations in Serbia. An advisory body was set up and its members became the main promoters of the declaration.

Initially, Otpor's activities were limited to the University of Belgrade. In an effort to gather new nonpartisan energy, not to mention making it harder for state media to discredit and smear them as just another opposition political group, Otpor avoided publicizing its ties to the Democratic Party (DS) even though the two organizations held similar political goals and shared many of the same members. Early on they agreed the organization's symbol to be the clenched fist. Young designer Nenad "Duda" Petrović created the logo.

Four students get arrested for stenciling Otpor logo
The authorities' immediate reaction to the appearance of Otpor was extremely heavy-handed, even before the movement held any public gatherings. In the early morning hours of Wednesday, 4 November 1998, four students – 22-year-old Teodora Tabački (enrolled at the University of Belgrade's Faculty of Philosophy), Marina Glišić (22, Faculty of Philosophy), Dragana Milinković (22, Faculty of Philology), and Nikola Vasiljević (19, University of Arts' FDU) – were arrested for stencil spraying the clenched fist symbol on the UofB's Faculty of Mathematics building facade. Later that same day, after reportedly being intimidated into signing a pre-typed, joint statement of guilt, the four students were taken before a misdemeanor judge who handed them a sentence of 10 days in prison. In his explanation of the sentence, judge Željko Muniža cited that "with their brazen and reckless behaviour, the four students have endangered the citizens' calm and disturbed the public order." On 5 November, the students' legal representatives – Nikola Barović, Branko Pavlović, and Dušan Stojković – appealed the respective sentences citing "improper use of both the misdemeanor process and the misdemeanor law as well as the scandalous subsequent sanction." One day later, the misdemeanor council rejected the appeal as baseless.

The case generated some public reaction with the University of Belgrade's Faculty of Electrical Engineering professor and Otpor member Srbijanka Turajlić calling the sentences "inappropriate" and further scolding the University of Belgrade rector Jagoš Purić as well as University of Arts rector Radmila Bakočević for "not publicly reacting to their own students being rounded-up on the street and hauled off to jail".

Dnevni telegraf gets fined for publishing an Otpor ad
The organization gained further prominence when the Dnevni telegraf (daily tabloid owned and edited by Slavko Ćuruvija) 7 November issue appeared on newsstands with Otpor's ad featuring the clenched fist symbol on the front page. The paper had previously been banned for "spreading defeatism by running subversive headlines", a punishment meted out under the controversial new government decree. And though the ban was lifted within a week as the decree was put out of effect only to be replaced by the new information law, Dnevni telegrafs publishing hiatus continued past the ban being lifted and the 7 November issue was its return to the newsstands. Seeing the Otpor ad on the front page, the authorities quickly reacted again, taking Ćuruvija and his collaborators to court within days via a trumped up private citizen's complaint and handing them another draconian fine under the information law, this time prompting the newspaper's relocation to Podgorica.

Veran Matić wears Otpor t-shirt during MTV Europe Awards live broadcast
Several days later, on Thursday, 12 November, another instance of Otpor's public exposure occurred – this time at the 1998 MTV Europe Music Awards ceremony in Assago near Milan where Radio B92 was the recipient of the Free Your Mind award. Accepting the award presented by Michael Stipe, Peter Buck, and Mike Mills of R.E.M. during live broadcast, B92 head Veran Matić came out on stage in an Otpor T-shirt with inscription "Живи Отпор!" (Live the Resistance) above the clenched fist logo. In his acceptance speech, delivered in Serbian, Matić explicitly mentioned the four students that were arrested and sentenced the previous week.

The awards ceremony was carried live in Serbia on TV Košava, a station owned at the time by Milošević's daughter Marija. However, when it came time for the Free Your Mind award to be handed out in the live broadcast, only the initial intro by R.E.M. and part of the accompanying pre-taped video piece about Radio B92 was shown before abruptly cutting to an extended block of commercials.

Otpor's first significant gathering took place on Saturday, 14 November at the University of Belgrade Faculty of Electrical Engineering – over a thousand students marched across town to the Faculty of Philology where a number of students were under lockdown inside the building as the authorities wanted to prevent them from joining the protest. Otpor leader Srđa Popović (also a member of the Democratic Party) was arrested that day and then released on intervention from Amnesty International after being detained for 8 hours. By late November, Otpor ideas reached Novi Sad, Serbia's second city, with the first graffiti appearing on buildings in the city.

During the NATO air-strikes against FR Yugoslavia in 1999 regarding the Kosovo War, Otpor ceased its activities. In the aftermath of NATO bombing, the organization began a political campaign aimed directly against the Yugoslav president Slobodan Milošević. This resulted in nationwide police repression against Otpor activists, during which nearly 2,000 were arrested, some beaten.

Organization grows into a movement

Otpor next managed to bring opposition parties together and mobilize the population of Serbia against Milošević. It stressed the importance of mobilizing the population to vote, but also promoted "individual resistance" (i.e. nonviolent methods of civic disobedience in order to counter possible electoral fraud). This strategy was slowly embraced by the opposition parties in the months to come.

The strategy was based on two assumptions:
 That the opposition had to be united around one presidential candidate in order to get more votes than Milošević; and
 That Milošević would never accept defeat in the elections (and he would falsify ballots and even use force to defend his power).

By fall 1999 and early 2000, the Serbian opposition political parties, most notably the Democratic Party and the Serbian Renewal Movement (SPO), realized the potency of Otpor's methods and the resonance of its message with the youth. Thus began the battle for control of Otpor between DS and SPO. Since both parties already had a significant number of their youth wing members within Otpor, this trend continued on a large scale with both DS and SPO (and other opposition parties as well) instructing their local chapters throughout Serbia to recruit party youth members en masse into Otpor. As a result, Otpor's membership swelled into tens of thousands.

Otpor's unified message and diverse membership proved much more attractive to young activists than the deeply divided opposition parties of the time. Although they had found common ground in Otpor, the separate opposition parties were still reluctant to cooperate among themselves. Otpor's major challenge was to bring these divided groups together in preparation for the 2000 election campaign. Instead of using old methods of "bringing everyone to the table and then…trying to come up with a common strategy and goal", the original core group of Otpor founders had gathered to first find a single goal that everyone could agree upon: removing Milošević.

During the presidential campaign of September 2000, Otpor launched its "Gotov je" (He's Finished!) and the "Vreme Je!" (It's Time!) campaigns, which galvanized national discontent with Milošević and eventually resulted in his defeat. Some students who led Otpor used Serbian translations of Gene Sharp's writings on nonviolent action as a theoretical basis for their campaigns.

Otpor became one of the defining symbols of the anti-Milošević struggle and his subsequent overthrow. By aiming their activities at the pool of youth abstainers and other disillusioned voters, Otpor contributed to one of the biggest turnouts ever for the 24 September 2000 federal presidential elections with more than 4,77 million votes (72% of the total electorate).

Persuading a large number of the traditional electorate to abandon Milošević was another one of the areas where Otpor played a key role. Milošević had in the past succeeded in persuading the public that his political opponents were traitors working for foreign interests, but in the case of Otpor, the tactic largely backfired, as the beatings and imprisonments of their members during the summer of 2000 only further cemented the decision to vote against the government in many voters' minds.

Strategy and tactics

Principles of the movement
Otpor operated on the basis of three principles: unity, planning, and nonviolent discipline.

It used the following ten strategies to achieve success:
 Take an offensive approach
 Understand the concept of "power in numbers"
 Develop a superior communication strategy
 Create the perception of a successful movement
 Invest in the skills and knowledge of activists
 Cultivate external support
 Induce security force defections
 Resist oppressionPlan B: Using Secondary Protests to Undermine Repression  Zorana Smiljanic 
 By means of decentralized leadership, education, using humor to maintain morale, and supporting members who had been arrested
 Use elections to trigger change
 Enable peaceful transition of power

Tactics

Protest and persuasion
 Public theater and street acts to mock Milošević
 Extensive branding by hanging posters and stickers in widely trafficked areas
 Rallies, marches, and demonstration
 Electoral politics – campaigning & coalition-building
 Concerts and cultural celebrations
 Distribution of anti-Milošević materials
 Strategic use of internet, fax, and email to organize and distribute information and volunteers 
 Covert and public communication important community leaders to cultivate allies
 Public statements, press releases, petitions, and speeches
 Distribution of training manuals, frequent workshops for activists

Noncooperation
 Boycotts and strikes by students, artists, actors, and business owners
 General strikes
 Defection of both security forces and members of the media
 Organization that occurred outside the electoral system
 Election monitors and well-organized election results reporting system

Nonviolent intervention
 Blockades of highways in order to debilitate the economy and demonstrate power
 Occupation of key public buildings, occasional nonviolent invasions of said buildings
 Bulldozers moving aside police barricades

Examples of specific campaigns

Humor was the basis of Otpor's campaigns; it used irony to provoke the government and motivate Serbians to join the movement. The following are specific campaigns designed by Otpor in 1998-2000A Dinar for Change: Otpor activists painted Milošević's face on a barrel and set up in front of the Belgrade National Theater, asking passersby to pay one Yugoslav dinar to hit the portrait. The activists went to the sidelines and watched as the barrel attracted more and more attention. Police eventually confiscated the barrel.Happy Birthday Milošević: Activists in Niš created this event to "celebrate" Milošević's party with a cake, a card, gifts, and wishes. More than 2,000 citizens had the opportunity to sign the card, and gifts such as handcuffs, a one-way ticket to the Hague, and a prison uniform were received on his behalf.The Fist is the Salute: A poster campaign depicting many well-known Serbians raising their fists in opposition to Milošević. Over 50,000 copies were distributed. The campaign ended on New Year's with a Santa Claus fist poster.Resistance, Because I Love Serbia: The most widespread poster campaign with a circulation of 150,000.This is THE Year: 3,000 people gathered in downtown Belgrade for a New Year's party in January 2000. After a night of celebration, Otpor interrupted the jubilation with pictures of the horrors of the past ten years, telling Serbian they had nothing to celebrate. The people were asked to go home peacefully and to think about how they were going to change their situation.It's spreading: In Spring 2000, Otpor undertook efforts to spread the movement to rural areas and the nonacademic population.It's time!: A clock showing five minutes to twelve with the slogan "vreme je!" was used to convince all audiences that they must quickly act.He's finished!: Otpor's most well-known campaign. Close to the elections, volunteers put up over 1,500,000 "He's finished!" (Gotov je! / Готов је!) stickers on existing posters of Milošević and all over cities.Use it!: Campaign for raising awareness of HIV/AIDS and approaching general elections in December. Posters, pamphlets, and condom packages featured stylized image of human brain.Stamp it!:''' Campaign employed by Otpor after the fall of Milošević. The campaign reminded Serbians that they must follow through by defeating Milošević in the December general elections.

Post-Milošević
In the immediate months following 5th October Overthrow, Otpor members were suddenly the widely praised heroes throughout FR Yugoslavia as well as in the eyes of Western governments. From the wide range of local celebrities and public figures seeking positive attention by wearing Otpor T-shirts, to Partizan basketball club painting the Otpor logo in the center circle for their FIBA Suproleague game, the clenched fist was omnipresent. This widespread popularity inspired even some individuals tied to the former government to become involved with the DOS authorities by praising Otpor and its activities.

The pop-culture component of Otpor's activities became especially pronounced in this period. On 16 November, little over a month after the overthrow, Otpor received the Free Your Mind award at the 2000 MTV Europe Music Awards. Activists Milja Jovanović and Branko Ilić were on hand in Stockholm to accept the award presented to them by French actor Jean Reno. Back home a couple of days later, FR Yugoslavia's foreign minister Goran Svilanović held a reception for Otpor's delegation consisting of Milja Jovanović, Ivan Andrić, and Nenad Konstantinović in order to congratulate them on the MTV award. Then, in early December, Serbian singer-songwriter Đorđe Balašević held a concert in Belgrade's National Theater specifically for and in praise of Otpor members, which was televised nationally on RTS2. The movement even turned to concert promotion itself, organizing several Laibach gigs in Belgrade.

In the midst of all the praise and adulation, the movement promised to keep on. Otpor initially attempted to establish itself in a "watch dog" role after the revolution by launching campaigns holding the new government accountable, pressing for democratic reforms, and fighting corruption. It started weeks after the revolution with "Samo vas gledamo" (We're Watching You) campaign, sending the message of accountability to new authorities. In parallel, by November 2000, with the upcoming December 2000 parliamentary elections, launched two campaigns named "Overi" (Verify It) and "Upotrebi ga" (Use It). Though some already questioned the movement's raison d'être, the idea behind both was to encourage the electorate to "verify" the 5 October revolution by voting against the parties that were part of the government – the Socialist Party of Serbia (SPS) and the Serbian Radical Party (SRS) – at the upcoming constituent republic-level parliamentary election.

In 2001, the corruption monitoring becoming the new focus with several new anti-corruption campaigns started (Bez anestezije, etc.), but it was clear that Otpor experienced problems staying relevant on the transformed political scene of Serbia and FR Yugoslavia.

Revelation of U.S. involvement
By late November 2000, information started appearing about substantial outside assistance Otpor received leading up to the revolution. Otpor was a recipient of substantial funds from U.S. government-affiliated organizations such as the National Endowment for Democracy (NED), International Republican Institute (IRI), and US Agency for International Development (USAID).

Contacting various officials from the U.S. based organizations, in his New York Times Magazine piece, journalist Roger Cohen sought to shed some light on the extent of American logistical and financial assistance received by Otpor. Paul B. McCarthy from the Washington-based NED stated that Otpor received the majority of US$3 million spent by NED in Serbia from September 1998 until October 2000. At the same time, McCarthy himself held a series of meetings with Otpor's leaders in Podgorica, as well as Szeged and Budapest.

Just how much of the US resources appropriated in the year 2000 by USAID, for democracy and governance, which included support to groups that worked to bring an end to the Milošević era through peaceful, democratic means, went to Otpor is not clear. However, what is clear is that the Democratic Opposition of Serbia—a broad alliance of those seeking Slobodan Milošević's downfall, among them the Democratic Party (Serbia) Otpor would later merge with—received in excess of $30 million to "purchase cell phones and computers for DOS's leadership and to recruit and train an army of 20,000 election monitors" as well as to supplement them with "a sophisticated marketing campaign with posters, badges and T-shirts." Donald L. Pressley, the assistant administrator at USAID said that several hundred thousand dollars were given to Otpor directly for similar purposes.

Daniel Calingaert, an official with IRI, said Otpor received "some of the US$1.8 million" his institute spent in the country throughout 2000, but didn't specify the concrete figures. He also said he met Otpor leaders "seven to ten times" in Montenegro (then part of FR Yugoslavia), and Hungary, beginning in October 1999. IRI particularly focused a lot of its attention on Otpor, organizing a seminar on nonviolent resistance at the Hilton Hotel in Budapest during March 2000 and paying for about two dozen Otpor leaders to attend it. Lectured by retired U.S. Army Colonel Robert Helvey, who did two tours of duty in the Vietnam War before devoting himself to study of nonviolent resistance methods around the world, including those used in Burma and the civil rights struggle in the American South, the Serbian students received training in such matters as how to organize a strike, how to communicate with symbols, how to overcome fear and how to undermine the authorities.

Transformation into a political party
The official announcement of Otpor's transformation into a political party was made on 19 November 2003, days after the parliamentary elections had been set for 23 December. The party didn't name an official leader. However, cousins Slobodan Homen and Nenad Konstantinović played key roles. Asked about the new party's finances in November 2003, Konstantinović said it was funded by the Serbian companies.

Otpor started its election campaign on Saturday, 29 November 2003 by submitting its 250-person candidate list. In addition to former Otpor activists such as Slobodan Homen, Nenad Konstantinović, Ivan Marović, Predrag Lečić, Stanko Lazendić, and Srđan Milivojević, the candidate list featured established professionals in other arenas such as professor and anti-corruption campaigner Čedomir Čupić, political analyst Dušan Janjić, psychologist Žarko Trebješanin, lawyer Boža Pelević, and former Serbian Supreme Court vice-president Zoran Ivošević. The candidate list named "Otpor—Freedom, Solidarity and Justice" led by Čupić fared poorly, with only 62,116 votes (1.6% of total vote) in the 2003 Serbian parliamentary election, which left it out of the parliament (the census required a minimum of 5%).

By spring 2004, in the aftermath of the election, the organization faced more turmoil when Branimir Nikolić, a prominent activist from Otpor's Subotica chapter, publicly accused the party central, namely Homen and Konstantinović, of embezzlement. Soon after, another member of Otpor, Zoran Matović, joined Nikolić's accusations, claiming that out of the €2.1 million that came into the organization during 2001 and 2002, more than half went missing.Pripadnici Otpora optužuju svoje kolege da su prisvojili novac od stranih sponzora: Svađa u Otporu oko dva milona dolara ;Glas javnosti, 26 April 2004 Responding to the accusations in both instances, Homen announced his intention to sue both Nikolić and Matović.

End
In early September 2004, amid internal turmoil, the remnants of Otpor merged into the Democratic Party led by Boris Tadić.

The observer reaction in Serbia to the dissolution of Otpor was mixed. Some talked of Otpor's "ideologically heterogeneous membership that in addition to progressives also contained those well infected with Milošević's war propaganda", seeing the organization's eventual demise in the post-Milošević period as the victory of the latter over the former, while others believed Otpor's failure in the political arena was caused by its inability to disassociate itself from foreign aid.

Commemorative reunions and usage of Otpor symbols
In the years since its dissolution, Otpor's symbols and imagery occasionally reappeared in Serbian political life. Some of the former Otpor activists also organized a few official commemorative gatherings.

In April 2008, during the election campaign ahead of the parliamentary election, the clenched fist was stenciled on several walls in Novi Sad. This led to an announcement of Otpor's reactivation by its former activist Nenad Šeguljev,Otpor says it's back in business ;B92, 11 April 2008 however nothing ever came of it.

Later that year on 13 November, Serbian president Boris Tadić held a reception to commemorate the 10th anniversary of Otpor's founding. Former activists Srđa Popović, Slobodan Đinović, Slobodan Homen, Nenad Konstantinović, Dejan Ranđić, Ivan Andrić, Andreja Stamenković, Milja Jovanović, Branko Ilić, Srđan Milivojević, Jovan Ratković, Predrag Lečić, Vlada Pavlov, Stanko Lazendić, Miloš Gagić, and Siniša Šikman were on hand at the presidential palace at Andrićev Venac, giving Tadic an old Otpor poster. Tadić underscored Otpor's "important role in the democratization of Serbia". The next day, in Stari dvor, the exhibition of Otpor's materials was opened with Belgrade mayor Dragan Đilas saluting the former movement for "the courage shown in the fight for democratic changes and thus enabling others to live in a normal country".

In July 2011, posters with clenched fist and a message "Pruži Otpor svakoj lošoj vlasti" (Resist all bad authorities) appeared all over the city of Bor, protesting the local authorities' decision to build a roundabout.

In October 2011, the Democratic Party (DS) official web site (ds.org.rs) was taken down by unknown hackers who left the Otpor logo on the site.

Otpor leaders after Otpor
Though its members often proudly talked of the movement's "horizontal command hierarchy" and its lack of established leadership structure, Otpor still exhibited a top-down organizational model with several members from its Belgrade central office clearly asserting themselves as the main decision makers. Their involvement in Otpor served as a springboard to Serbian political, business, and NGO careers.

Srđa Popović and Ivan Marović
In terms of media exposure, Srđa Popović is Otpor's best known member. He features prominently in Western television news items and documentaries about the movement such as the BAFTA-winning feature documentary How to Start a Revolution and PBS' Bringing Down A Dictator as well as numerous international print and Internet media pieces about the direct and indirect influence of former Otpor members on various post-2000 revolutions around the globe.Revolution U ;Foreign Policy, 16 February 2011Arab Uprisings, from Serbia ;DigitalJournal.com, 8 March 2011So you want a revolution... ;The Independent, 11 September 2011 ;Blic, 9 December 2010Manea, Octavian and Srdja Popovic, "The Non-Violent Struggle as Asymmetric Warfare: Interview with Srdja Popovic", 26 March 2012, Small Wars Journal, http://smallwarsjournal.com/jrnl/art/nonviolent-struggle-as-asymmetric-warfare-interview-with-srdja-popovic , 30 May 2012

Shortly after 5 October 2000 revolution, he left Otpor to pursue a political career in Serbia, becoming a Democratic Party (DS) MP in the Serbian assembly as well as an environmental adviser to prime minister Zoran Đinđić. In essence, it was 27-year-old Popović's return to the DS since he was active in the party's youth wing since the early 1990s.

Simultaneous to his political engagement, Popović, together with former colleagues from Otpor Predrag Lečić and Andreja Stamenković, founded the environmental non-governmental organization Green Fist. Conceptualized as an "ecological movement", it attempted to transfer some of Otpor's mass appeal into environmental issues by using similar imagery, but soon folded.

In 2003, Popović, with another prominent former Otpor member Slobodan Đinović, co-founded Centre for Applied Non Violent Actions and Strategies, (CANVAS), an organization focused on the use of nonviolent conflict to promote human rights and democracy, and eventually quit actively participating in Serbian politics. Instead, he started to cooperate with Stratfor, which paid for Popović lectures about CANVAS fomenting color revolutions also in Iran, Venezuela and Egypt.

In 2006, Popović and two of his former Otpor colleagues, now CANVAS members – Slobodan Đinović and Andrej Milivojević – authored a book called Nonviolent Struggle: 50 Crucial Points, a how-to guide to nonviolent struggle, which can be downloaded for free in six languages from their website. The book was financed with a grant from the United States Institute of Peace (USIP), an organization founded and funded by the U.S. Congress. The book has been downloaded some 20,000 times in the Middle East, mostly by Iranians. Due to their involvement in regime changes all around the globe, CANVAS has been labeled "Academy of Revolution" while Popović and others involved in the organization have been referred to by various media outlets as "professors of revolution", "revolution consultants", "professional revolutionaries", and "revolution exporters".

In 2007, Popović became adviser to Serbian deputy prime minister Božidar Đelić.

Popović additionally heads the Ecotopia fund, the non-profit organization dealing with the environmental issues, financially backed by various Serbian governmental institutions as well as the private sector. In 2009, the fund organized a wide environmental campaign featuring well-known Serbian actors and media personalities with television spots and newspaper ads. On top of that Popović is a board member of International Communications Partners, a media and PR consulting company.

Today, in addition to their revolution-consulting and training activities through CANVAS that according to one report take up a third of their year, Popović is active on the speaking engagement circuit throughout various Western countries where they're frequently hired by universities, institutes, and think-tanks to give lectures and hold workshops on strategy and organization of nonviolent struggle. Since 2008. Popović and Đinović have also launched CANVAS-related graduate program in cooperation with University of Belgrade's Faculty of Political Science.

From 2011 to 2012, Popovic was a visiting scholar at Columbia University's Harriman Institute.

In November 2011, Foreign Policy Magazine listed Srdja Popovic as one of the "Top 100 Global Thinkers" of 2011 for inspiring the Arab Spring protesters directly and indirectly and educating activists about nonviolent social change in the Middle East.

In February 2012, Srdja Popovic was named to "The Smart List 2012" by Wired UK magazine as one of 50 people who will change the world.

Popovic appeared in the 2011 BAFTA award-winning film, How to Start a Revolution.

In addition to Popović, Ivan Marović is another Otpor activist with significant media presence, both before and after Milošević fell. During the movement's activist days leading up to the overthrow, his appearances in the anti-government Serbian media were in the capacity of one of the movement's spokespeople.Ivan Marović, istaknuti aktivista Otpora, za "Glas": Ako treba, ulazimo u SPS ;Glas javnosti, 30 May 2000

He stayed at Otpor even after the transformation into the political party and was its MP candidate at the December 2003 parliamentary election. He also became active on the speaking engagement circuit, mostly in the United States, where like Popović he gives lectures on his experiences from Otpor days. Additionally, Marović is one of the designers behind A Force More Powerful and People Power: The Game of Civil Resistance, video games that promote nonviolent struggle as a political tool. During the mid-2000s (decade) he moved to the United States where in 2007 he earned his master's degree from the Fletcher School of Law and Diplomacy at Tufts University in Medford, Massachusetts. In the late 2000s (decade) he returned to Serbia. Since the mid-2000s (decade), he has maintained a blog on B92.net.

Slobodan "Cole" Homen and Nenad "Neca" Konstantinović
Unlike Popović and Marović, Slobodan Homen mostly kept behind the scenes while at Otpor. Born to affluent parents – prominent Belgrade lawyers Borivoje Homen and Dušanka Subotić – young Slobodan was raised in privileged circumstances. During his days studying law, before becoming one of Otpor's founding members, he was the president of the University of Belgrade's student parliament. Described by sources quoted in the Serbian media as Otpor's "alpha and omega" during the movement's heyday in the spring and summer of 2000, Homen and his cousin Nenad Konstantinović handled everything from money to transportation. Homen was also the main point of contact for the foreign-based organizations that donated significant funds to Otpor. Otpor's headquarters was owned by Homen's family. Some accused Homen of an obvious conflict of interest in this situation after allegations appeared that his family actually rented out the space to Otpor, which was paying for it with the money from the incoming donations.

After Milošević's overthrow, Homen and Konstantinović were of the opinion that Otpor should evolve into a political party, which put them at odds with some of the movement's other activists. The two eventually got their way in 2003, but did poorly at the parliamentary elections later that year. Simultaneously, Homen and his family were involved in various high-profile real-estate business ventures in the city of Belgrade, some of which raised controversy.

After Otpor merged into the Democratic Party, Homen set about building a political career there. In 2008, he became state secretary in the Serbian Ministry of Justice working under cabinet minister Snežana Malović, within the government of prime minister Mirko Cvetković. Following the 10 October 2010 mass rioting by the right-wing groups in protest of the Belgrade gay pride parade, standing in front of the Democratic Party headquarters that were attacked by the rioters, Homen went on state-television airwaves, delivering a threatening message to the "hooligans". Speaking to a reporter, Homen said: "I can guarantee you that they'll remember this day because the state's response to this will be chilling". In March 2011, Homen was named the Serbian government's PR coordinator.

Konstantinović, another Otpor founding member, also went on to a notable career within the Democratic Party (DS). He's the president of the Serbian parliamentary administrative board and was a high-ranking official of the ruling coalition that held power in Serbia from 2008 until 2012.

Slobodan Đinović
During his Otpor days, Slobodan Đinović, leader of the student organization at the University of Belgrade's Faculty of Mechanical Engineering, founded an NGO called the Center for Political Analysis (CPA). The idea behind the venture was to set up an organization ready to become an alternative source for disseminating information in case Milošević shut down all the non-governmental media outlets.

Soon after Milošević fell, Đinović founded Media Works, the first Wi-Fi provider in Serbia. Center for Political Analysis eventually folded as Đinović decided to focus more on his budding telecommunications business. In parallel, he was active with CANVAS.

In early 2010, Media Works merged with wired Internet providers Neobee.net and SezamPro to form Orion Telekom, of which Đinović is the CEO. Utilizing a government-issued licence for providing fixed wireless services that Media Works won in 2009, Orion began offering fixed telephony services throughout Serbia using the CDMA method of access in June 2010.

In the documentary film The Revolution Business produced by Austrian TV ORF and distributed by Journeyman Pictures, Srdja Popović claimed Đinović is the main financial backer of CANVAS. Đinović is also the managing board member of the state-owned Ada Ciganlija company, which manages the public grounds of the eponymous river island.

Ivan Andrić and Dejan Ranđić
The creative presence behind many of Otpor's visuals and media campaigns was Ivan Andrić. After the revolution, he left the movement for politics, joining the Civic Alliance of Serbia (GSS) and becoming managing board member of the state-owned Belgrade Youth Center. He later joined the Liberal Democratic Party (LDP), becoming its MP. Furthermore, in 2002, with close friend from Otpor days and Youth Center managing board colleague Dejan Ranđić (who would also later go on to become high-ranking LDP official), Andrić founded the marketing agency Gistro Advertising that has in the years since done prominent product launches and ad campaigns for various clients in Serbia such as government ministries, political parties (including the transformed Otpor), local municipalities, and state-owned enterprises.

Legacy
In addition to contributing to Slobodan Milošević's overthrow, Otpor has become the
model for similar youth movements around Eastern Europe. MTV granted Otpor the Free Your Mind award in 2000. There were several award-winning documentaries made about the movement, most notably Making of The Revolution by Eric Van Den Broek and Katarina Rejger (launched at the Amnesty International Film Festival in 2001) and Bringing Down A Dictator by Steve York, which won a Peabody Award in 2002, narrated by Martin Sheen. It has reportedly been seen by over 23 million people around the world.

Otpor members were instrumental in inspiring and providing hands-on training to several other civic youth organizations in Eastern Europe and elsewhere, including Kmara in the Republic of Georgia (itself partly responsible for the downfall of Eduard Shevardnadze), PORA (black)FLEDGLING YOUTH GROUPS WORRY POST-SOVIET AUTHORITIES  (which was part of the Orange Revolution) and Vidsich (opposing the president Viktor Yanukovych) in Ukraine, Zubr in Belarus (opposing the president Alexander Lukashenko), MJAFT! in Albania, Oborona in Russia (opposing the president Vladimir Putin), KelKel in Kyrgyzstan (active in the revolution that brought down the president Askar Akayev), Bolga in Uzbekistan (opposing Islam Karimov) and Nabad-al-Horriye in Lebanon. A similar group of students was present in Venezuela against Hugo Chávez. In 2008, an April 6 Youth Movement was founded in Egypt, which facilitated and joined the 2011 Egyptian protests, and took advice from Otpor in the process.

In 2002, some former Otpor members, most notably Slobodan Đinović and Srđa Popović, founded the Centre for Applied Nonviolent Action and Strategies (CANVAS). This NGO disseminated the lessons learned from their successful nonviolent struggle through scores of trainings and workshops for pro-democracy activists and others around the world, including in Egypt, Palestine, Western Sahara, West Papua, Eritrea, Belarus, Azerbaijan, Tonga, Burma and Zimbabwe as well as labor, anti-war, and immigration rights activists in the United States.

In their search for lessons learned from other activist movements, the April 6 Youth Movement in Egypt consulted with Otpor members and adopted some of their strategies in their rallying for the 2011 Egyptian revolution.

In interviews, the leaders and consultants of Otpor have described their involvement in the planning, coordination and implementation of the 2011 "Arab spring" revolutions.

See also
 Special operations
 Subversion
 Psyops
 Active measures
 Colour revolution
 From Dictatorship to Democracy''

References

1998 establishments in Serbia
Defunct political organizations in Serbia
Democracy movements
Nonviolent resistance movements
Overthrow of Slobodan Milošević
Political opposition organizations
Political parties established in 2003
Youth organizations based in Serbia